Formica talbotae is a species of ant in the subfamily Formicinae. It is native to the United States. It is named after entomologist Mary Talbot. It is a species of inquiline workerless parasites that take over nests who have recently lost their queens.

References

External links

talbotae
Hymenoptera of North America
Insects of the United States
Insects described in 1977
Taxonomy articles created by Polbot